The Graham number or Benjamin Graham number is a figure used in securities investing that measures a stock's so-called fair value. Named after Benjamin Graham, the founder of value investing, the Graham number can be calculated as follows:

The final number is, theoretically, the maximum price that a defensive investor should pay for the given stock. Put another way, a stock priced below the Graham Number would be considered a good value, if it also meets a number of other criteria. 

The Number represents the geometric mean of the maximum that one would pay based on earnings and based on book value. Graham writes:

Alternative calculation
Earnings per share is calculated by dividing net income by shares outstanding. Book value is another way of saying shareholders' equity. Therefore, book value per share is calculated by dividing equity by shares outstanding. Consequently, the formula for the Graham number can also be written as follows:

References

Valuation (finance)
Mathematical finance